Christine is the third album by Norwegian pop singer Christine Guldbrandsen, released in 2007 in Norway through MBN Music Business Norway. The album is progressive Celtic, using a combination of traditional and modern instruments.

Album information 
Guldbransen's third album and was released on February 5, 2007. The songs on this album span a wide range of styles, from ballads with choir and piano, to soundscapes. The lyrics are primarily in Norwegian, though Latin and English is used on a couple of songs. Guldbrandsen wrote several of the songs in collaboration with her creative team. One of these is Alvedansen, Norway's entry for the Eurovision Song Contest 2006, reworked for the album. Apart from one Norwegian folk song Den Dag Kjem Aldri the rest of the album is new material. The song Dansekjolen placed 1st in the Norwegian charts.

Reviews 

A review on the Musical Discoveries website states, "Artists can often deliver more emotional content when singing in their native tongue and this evolution has worked well for Christine... The combination of traditional instruments and modern arrange- ments work perfectly to support Christine's far ranging vocal power."

Track listing

References 

2007 albums
Christine Guldbrandsen albums